The Anthem of the Baruta Municipality has music by Inocente Carreño and lyrics by Ernesto Luis Rodríguez. It was adopted on June 7, 1994.

See also

 Baruta Municipality
 Seal of Baruta Municipality, Miranda
 Flag of Baruta Municipality, Miranda

Sources 
Baruta Municipality website

Baruta Municipality
Anthems of Venezuela
Venezuelan songs
Spanish-language songs